Lancey is a surname. Notable people with the surname include:

De Lancey Nicoll (1854–1931), New York County District Attorney
James De Lancey (loyalist) (1746–1804), political figure in Nova Scotia
Oliver DeLancey (disambiguation) (also known as Oliver DeLancey and Oliver de Lancey) may refer to:
 Oliver De Lancey (American loyalist) (1718–1785), merchant, a New York Loyalist politician and Major-general during the American War of Independence
 Oliver De Lancey (British Army general) (1749–1822), British Army officer who took served in the American War of Independence and the French Revolutionary Wars
 Oliver De Lancey (British Army and Spanish Legion officer) (1803–1837), British Army officer who volunteered for the Spanish Legion and died fighting in Spain during the First Carlist War
Stephen De Lancey (1738–1809), lawyer and political figure in New York state and Nova Scotia
William Howe De Lancey, (1778–1815), British Army officer of the Napoleonic Era, died of wounds received at the Battle of Waterloo

See also
La Combe-de-Lancey
Lance
De Lancie (disambiguation)
Delancey (disambiguation)